The NFL Top 100 Players of 2019 was the ninth season in the series. It premiered on July 22, 2019 and the final episode aired on July 31, 2019. It started later in the year, and the show was shown in 10 consecutive days instead. Los Angeles Rams defensive tackle Aaron Donald was named the number one player. The Dallas Cowboys had the most players on the list with 8, while the Buffalo Bills had no players on the list.

Episode list

The list

References 

National Football League trophies and awards
National Football League records and achievements
National Football League lists